Maximal may refer to:
Maximal element, a mathematical definition
Maximal (Transformers), a faction of Transformers
Maximalism, an artistic style
Maximal set
Maxim (magazine), a men's magazine marketed as Maximal in several countries

See also
Minimal (disambiguation)